Bankovci can refer to one of the following towns:

 Bankovci, Požega-Slavonia County
 Bankovci, Virovitica-Podravina County